Programmed cell death protein 10 is a protein that in humans is encoded by the PDCD10 gene.

Function 

This gene encodes a protein, originally identified in a premyeloid cell line, with similarity to proteins that participate in apoptosis. Three alternative transcripts encoding the same protein, differing only in their 5' UTRs, have been identified for this gene.

Gene 

Loss of function mutations in PDCD10 result in the onset of Cerebral Cavernous Malformations (CCM) illness.  Therefore, this gene is also called CCM3.  Cerebral cavernous malformations (CCMs) are vascular malformations in the brain and spinal cord made of dilated capillary vessels.

Interactions 

CCM3 encodes a protein called Programmed Cell Death 10 (PDCD10).  The function of this protein has only recently begun to be understood.  PDCD10 has roles in vascular development and VEGF signaling1, apoptosis and functions as part of a larger signaling complex that includes germinal center kinase III,.  Specifically, PDCD10 has been shown to interact with RP6-213H19.1, STK25, STRN, STRN3, MOBKL3, CTTNBP2NL, STK24 and FAM40A.

Model organisms

Model organisms have been used in the study of PDCD10 function. A conditional knockout mouse line, called Pdcd10tm1a(KOMP)Wtsi was generated as part of the International Knockout Mouse Consortium program — a high-throughput mutagenesis project to generate and distribute animal models of disease to interested scientists.

Male and female animals underwent a standardized phenotypic screen to determine the effects of deletion. Twenty five tests were carried out on mutant mice and two significant abnormalities were observed.  No homozygous mutant embryos were identified during gestation, and therefore none survived until weaning. The remaining tests were carried out on heterozygous mutant adult mice; no additional significant abnormalities were observed in these animals.

References

Further reading

External links 
www.angioma.org Angioma Alliance
www.ccm3.org CCM3 Action

Genes mutated in mice